Palazzo Mincuzzi is a historic building situated in Bari, Italy.

History 
The building, built between 1926 and 1928, was designed by architect Aldo Forcignanò and by engineer Gaetano Palmiotto. It was commissioned by the Mincuzzi family, who owned the department store of the same name, to house their business. The inauguration of the building took place on October 28, 1928 with the participation of the local authorities and many residents. It quickly rose as a symbol of commerce in Bari.

Description 
The building is a typical example of early 20th century commercial architecture. It features a late eclectic style, and is characterized by exuberant ornamentation and a corner dome.

References

External links

Buildings and structures in Bari